Backcombing (also known as teasing or ratting) is a way of combing hair which is used to create volume as well as to create certain hairstyles.  Backcombing is done by repeatedly combing the hair towards the scalp, causing the hair to tangle and knot up. This method is often used in creating various big hair styles such as beehives, bouffants and dreadlocks.

Notable wearers

In addition to Robert Smith of The Cure, British comedian Russell Brand is well known for his distinctive backcombed hairstyle, as are both Faris Rotter and Joshua Third of The Horrors, Brandon Jacobs of Neils Children, Gavin Tate of The Gaa Gaas, Harry Wade former guitarist of My Passion, Noel Fielding of The Mighty Boosh, Helena Bonham Carter, and Australian comedian and musician Tim Minchin. Cyndi Lauper also frequently "teased" her hair. Amy Winehouse also used to backcomb her hair into the distinctive "beehive", that was inspired by the 1960s girl groups, such as The Ronettes and The Crystals.

Potential hair damage
Because backcombing rubs against the scales of the hair's cuticle, it can cause serious and progressive damage to the hair's integrity. Over time, this leads to weakening and breakage. It can also cause tangles near the root that are very difficult to remove. Frequent backcombing is not recommended for people who want to maintain long hair.

Notes

Hairstyles